Glen Ernest Smith (born 21 May 1972) is a male retired English discus thrower.

Athletics career
Smith was a two-time competitor at the World Championships in Athletics (1997 and 1999). He represented England, at the 1994 Commonwealth Games in Victoria, British Columbia, Canada. and represented England, at the 1998 Commonwealth Games in Kuala Lumpur, Malaysia. A third consecutive appearance at the Games ensued at the 2002 Commonwealth Games.

His personal best throw is 65.11 metres, achieved in July 1999 in Barking. This places him third among English discus throwers, behind Perriss Wilkins and Richard Slaney.

International competitions

References

1972 births
Living people
British male discus throwers
English male discus throwers
Olympic athletes of Great Britain
Athletes (track and field) at the 1996 Summer Olympics
Athletes (track and field) at the 2000 Summer Olympics
Commonwealth Games competitors for England
Athletes (track and field) at the 1994 Commonwealth Games
Athletes (track and field) at the 1998 Commonwealth Games
Athletes (track and field) at the 2002 Commonwealth Games
World Athletics Championships athletes for Great Britain